Eberhard Metternich (b. 24 July 1959 in Limburg an der Lahn) is a German catholic church musician, school musician, singer, cathedral kapellmeister and professor for choral conducting in Cologne.

Metternich sang with the Limburger Domsingknaben as a youth. He also studied in Vienna and with Eric Ericson in Stockholm.

In 1985 Metternich became cantor in Mainz. Responsible for the conception of the Cologne Cathedral Music, he expanded the "Musikschule des Kölner Domchores" and founded the concert series "Geistliche Musik am Dreikönigsschrein" in 1991. In addition, Metternich led the collegium vocale limburg until the mid-1990s.

Since 1993, Metternich has been a lecturer for choral conducting at the Hochschule für Musik Köln. In 2001 he was appointed honorary professor there.

Awards 
With the Cologne Cathedral Choir he won first prize at the 6th  (2002) in Osnabrück in the category "Knabenchöre".
With the collegium vocale limburg he won the 1st prize in the category "male chamber choirs" at the 2nd German Choir Competition (1985) in Hanover.

Publication 
 Carl Leibl: Mass No. 3 in E flat major, published as first edition in the  series.

References

External links 
 
 
 

1959 births
Living people
People from Limburg an der Lahn
German choral conductors
Academic staff of the Hochschule für Musik und Tanz Köln